Yuzo Iwakami (岩上 祐三, born July 28, 1989) is a Japanese football player for Thespakusatsu Gunma.

Club statistics
Updated to 24 February 2019.

References

External links
Profile at Omiya Ardija
Profile at Matsumoto Yamaga

1989 births
Living people
Tokai University alumni
Association football people from Ibaraki Prefecture
Japanese footballers
J1 League players
J2 League players
Shonan Bellmare players
Matsumoto Yamaga FC players
Omiya Ardija players
Thespakusatsu Gunma players
Association football defenders
Association football midfielders